Mikhaylovka is a rural locality (a selo) and the administrative centre of Mikhaylovsky Selsoviet, Fyodorovsky District, Bashkortostan, Russia. The population was 305 as of 2010. There are 2 streets.

Geography 
Mikhaylovka is located 40 km south of Fyodorovka (the district's administrative centre) by road. Batyrovo is the nearest rural locality.

References 

Rural localities in Fyodorovsky District